Paula Mark Ngauamo (born 19 February 1990) is a Tongan rugby union player. He plays in the hooker position for the France based Top 14 side, Castres Olympique. Ngauamo also represents Tonga at international level.

Career

Club

In 2012, he went to Australia to compete in the Shute Shield with West Harbour RFC . The following season he returned to New Zealand and played as an amateur with Sydenham Rugby.

In 2014, when he was initially supposed to join French club Bergerac in Fédérale 1, he finally joined  in Top 14 as Neil Clark's medical replacement. 

At the end of the 2014-2015 season, he signed for two seasons at Stade Montois in Pro D2.

In 2017, he signed with SU Agen as a medical joker for Marc Barthomeuf. In January 2018, after strong performances, he extended his contract until the end of the season as an "extra player". In April of that same year, he further extended his commitment with the Agenais club until 2020.

In January 2021, after extra-sporting incidents, he was released from his contract with Agen and immediately joined Castres Olympique.

International
Ngauamo played for the New Zealand national under-20 rugby union team in the 2010 IRB Junior World Championship.

He made his debut for Tonga in on 7 June 2014 for a match against Samoa. He was later selected for the Tongan squad at the 2015 Rugby World Cup.  He played three games in the competition against Georgia , Namibia and New Zealand. He was suspended for three weeks for a dangerous tackle in the Pool match against New Zealand on 9 October.	

In 2019, he was retained in the Tongan group to compete in the World Cup in Japan. He played three games in this competition, against Argentina , France and the United States.

References

External links
 

Living people
Tongan rugby union players
1990 births
Tonga international rugby union players
Rugby union hookers